Renat Kharisovich Sabitov (born 13 June 1985) is a Russian football coach and a former player of Tatar origin. He is an assistant coach with FC Kosmos Dolgoprudny. Previously, he played for Saturn and Spartak Moscow. Contrary to popular belief, he is not son or relative of coach Ravil Sabitov.

Club career
Born in Moscow, he came into football through Chertanovo football school. In 2001, he signed for FC Khimki's amateur team and played next two years in the Russian Amateur Football League. In beginning of 2004 he signed for Saturn Moscow Oblast, but had played his first match only on 22 May 2005 (vs. Krylya Sovetov). About that time Sabitov started playing for the Russia U21 team. His contract with Saturn was about to end on 15 February 2007, but in December 2006 he refused to renew it and was subsequently bought by Spartak for approximately $200,000 to be able to start pre-season training with his new team immediately.

Career statistics

References

External links 

 Renat Sabitov's profile on Spartak website
 

1985 births
Footballers from Moscow
Living people
Russian footballers
Russia under-21 international footballers
Association football midfielders
FC Spartak Moscow players
FC Saturn Ramenskoye players
Tatar people of Russia
Tatar sportspeople
Russian Premier League players
FC Khimki players
FC Tom Tomsk players
FC Sibir Novosibirsk players
FC Sokol Saratov players
FC Mordovia Saransk players
FC Olimp-Dolgoprudny players